Fevzi Pakel (born 1936) is a Turkish long-distance runner. He competed in the men's 10,000 metres at the 1960 Summer Olympics.

References

1936 births
Living people
Athletes (track and field) at the 1960 Summer Olympics
Turkish male long-distance runners
Olympic athletes of Turkey
Place of birth missing (living people)